Institute of Organic Chemistry and Biochemistry of the Czech Academy of Sciences (shortened as IOCB Prague) is a research institute under the Czech Academy of Sciences (CAS). The institute centers around research in the fields of organic chemistry, biochemistry and neighboring disciplines, mostly oriented at applications in medicine and environment. It is known for its contribution in the development of key drugs against HIV and HBV. The institute also takes part in university education, supervising master's and doctoral theses.

Research 
IOCB's research in oriented on basic research in organic chemistry, bioorganic and medicinal chemistry, biochemistry, theoretical, physical, and analytical chemistry, materials science, bioconjugate chemistry, chemical biology, nanotechnology.

The research is conducted by approximately 50 independent groups divided into several categories according to their main research focus, type, and status:

 Cluster: CHEM, BIO, PHYS
 Type: research, research-service, targeted research, service
 Status: junior, senior, honorary, distinguished emeritus, distinguished

Impact 
In addition to basic research, IOCB has been active in applied research and practical applications, particularly in medicinal chemistry.

Its most significant results are acyclic nucleotide phosphonate antivirals (ANPs) discovered by Antonín Holý at IOCB in collaboration with Erik De Clercq from the Rega Institute, which revolutionized the development of antiviral drugs used in the treatment of HIV and hepatitis B. These compounds, later developed by Gilead Sciences, Inc. into approved drugs, include cidofovir, the first marketed compound from the ANPs family and approved for the treatment of cytomegalovirus retinitis in AIDS patients, adefovir, approved as a drug for treatment of hepatitis B and marketed as Hepsera, and tenofovir. Its prodrug forms tenofovir disoproxil fumarate and tenofovir alafenamide fumarate developed by Gilead Sciences were used in multiple drugs used for the treatment of HIV/AIDS and chronic hepatitis B, e.g. Viread (approved in 2001), Truvada (2004), Atripla (2006), Complera/Eviplera (2011), Stribild (2012), Genvoya (2015), Odefsey (2016), Descovy (2016), Vemlidy (2016), Biktarvy (2018), Symtuza (2018).

The success of ANPs and widespread use in HIV drugs brought IOCB significant financial resources making it the richest research institution in the Czech Republic, allowing to extend and refurbish its campus and grow significantly. Its general income from licenses in 2021 was around USD 130 mil. 

At IOCB originated also other nucleoside compounds which became approved drugs: Decitabine used in the treatment of acute myeloid leukemia and Azacytidine for myelodysplastic syndrome, both discovered by Alois Pískala, and an acyclic nucleoside analogue duvira, 9-(2,3-dihydroxypropyl)adenine (DHPA), discovered by Antonín Holý, clinically used in treatment of infections caused by the herpes simplex virus.

Among its other achievements are human peptide hormones and their analogues, eg. the development of first method for industrial production of human neurohypophysial hormone oxytocin by Josef Rudinger, development of its analogues, such as Carbetocin, or the development of Lysin-vasopressin, Terlipressin, and Desmopressin, as well as an ointment Dermazulen based on a natural compound Guaiazulene.

History 
The original institute that has later turned into IOCB was established at the end of the Second World War before the establishment of CAS. The original institute was established under the Faculty of Chemistry of Czech Technical University in Prague and has been renamed multiple times. The official date that is considered as the establishment of IOCB is the year 1953, when the institute was renamed Institute of Organic Chemistry and incorporated into newly established Czechoslovak Academy of Sciences. In 1955, the institute was renamed to Chemical Institute of CAS. The institute was finally renamed to IOCB in 1993, after the dissolution of Czechoslovakia and establishment of the Czech Republic. In 2007, the institute was transformed into a public research institute.

References 

Czech Academy of Sciences
Science and technology in the Czech Republic
Research institutes established in 1953
Research institutes in the Czech Republic
Chemical research institutes

Institute of Organic Chemistry and Biochemistry of the CAS
1953 establishments in Czechoslovakia